Cliffside Public School is a historic school complex located at Cliffside, Rutherford County, North Carolina.  It was designed by architect Louis H. Asbury (1877-1975) and built in 1920–1921. It is a two-story on basement, "T"-plan, Classical Revival style terra cotta tile building sheathed in glazed brick.  The front facade features a tetrastyle two-story portico of Indiana limestone. The vocational and physical education building, erected by the Work Projects Administration in 1940–1941.  Also on the property are the contributing series of fieldstone masonry structures built in 1940–1941.It sits on landscaped grounds designed by Earle Sumner Draper.

It was added to the National Register of Historic Places in 1998.

References

Works Progress Administration in North Carolina
School buildings on the National Register of Historic Places in North Carolina
Neoclassical architecture in North Carolina
School buildings completed in 1920
Buildings and structures in Rutherford County, North Carolina
National Register of Historic Places in Rutherford County, North Carolina
1920 establishments in North Carolina